The following lists events that happened during 2013 in the Republic of Haiti.

Incumbents
President: Michel Martelly
Prime Minister: Laurent Lamothe

Events

November
 November 26 - At least 30 Haitian migrants die when a boat capsizes off the Bahamas.

December
 December 25 - Eighteen Haitian migrants drown off the Turks and Caicos Islands after their sailboat carrying more than 50 suspected immigrants capsized while being towed into port.

References

 
Haiti
2010s in Haiti
Haiti
Years of the 21st century in Haiti